Taeniacanthidae is a family of cyclopoid copepods in the order Cyclopoida. There are more than 20 genera and 120 described species in Taeniacanthidae.

Genera
These 23 genera belong to the family Taeniacanthidae:

 Anchistrotos Brian, 1906
 Biacanthus Tang & Izawa, 2005
 Caudacanthus Tang & Johnston, 2005
 Cepolacanthus Venmathi Maran, Moon, Adday & Tang, 2016
 Cirracanthus Dojiri & Cressey, 1987
 Clavisodalis Humes, 1970
 Clavisodulis
 Echinirus Humes & Cressey, 1961
 Echinosocius Humes & Cressey, 1961
 Haemaphilus Hesse, 1871
 Irodes C. B. Wilson, 1911
 Metataeniacanthus Pillai, 1963
 Nudisodalis Dojiri & Cressey, 1987
 Phagus Wilson C.B., 1911
 Pseudotaeniacanthus Yamaguti & Yamasu, 1959
 Saging Uyeno, Tang & Nagasawa, 2013
 Scolecicara Ho, 1969
 Suncheonacanthus Venmathi Maran, Moon, Adday & Tang, 2016
 Taeniacanthodes C. B. Wilson, 1935
 Taeniacanthus Sumpf, 1871
 Taeniastrotos Cressey, 1969
 Tucca Krøyer, 1837
 Umazuracola Ho, Ohtsuka & Nakadachi, 2006

References

Cyclopoida
Articles created by Qbugbot
Crustacean families